Blastobasis is the type genus of the gelechioid moth family Blastobasidae; in some arrangements these are placed in the case-bearer family (Coleophoridae) as a subfamily. Within the Blastobasidae, the subfamily Blastobasinae (or tribe Blastobasini, if united with the concealer moths) has been established to distinguish the Blastobasis lineage from the group around Holcocera, but the delimitation is not yet well-resolved.

The monophyly of this genus – the largest of its family, containing at present about half the described Blastobasidae species – is seriously in doubt. Many presumed relatives have been separated in small or even monotypic genera, which may actually represent specialized lineages within the Blastobasis assemblage. On the other hand, some formerly-independent genera are usually included in Blastobasis at the moment. Agnoea, Auximobasis, Euresia and Zenodochium are sometimes included here but considered distinct by other authors.

Species
Species of Blastobasis include:

 Blastobasis abollae
 Blastobasis acarta Meyrick, 1911
 Blastobasis achaea
 Blastobasis acirfa Adamski, 2010
 Blastobasis adustella
 Blastobasis aedes
 Blastobasis aequivoca Meyrick, 1922
 Blastobasis albidella Rebel, 1928
 Blastobasis anachasta Meyrick, 1931
 Blastobasis anthoptera
 Blastobasis aphanes Zeller, 1877
 Blastobasis aphilodes Meyrick, 1918
 Blastobasis argillacea Walsingham, 1897
 Blastobasis athymopa Meyrick, 1932
 Blastobasis atlantella Zerny, 1935
 Blastobasis atmosema Meyrick, 1930
 Blastobasis atmozona Meyrick, 1939
 Blastobasis aynekiella Adamski, 2010
 Blastobasis babae
 Blastobasis balucis
 Blastobasis basipectenella
 Blastobasis bassii Sinev & Karsholt, 2004
 Blastobasis beo
 Blastobasis bilineatella Lucas, 1956
 Blastobasis bispinaella
 Blastobasis bromeliae (Walsingham, 1912)
 Blastobasis byrsodepta Meyrick, 1913
 Blastobasis caetrae
 Blastobasis candidata Meyrick, 1922
 Blastobasis catappaella Adamski, 2010
 Blastobasis centralasiae Sinev, 2007
 Blastobasis chanes
 Blastobasis chloroptris Meyrick, 1931
 Blastobasis christou
 Blastobasis chuka Adamski, 2010
 Blastobasis cineracella Amsel, 1953
 Blastobasis coffeaella
 Blastobasis commendata Meyrick, 1922
 Blastobasis confamulella
 Blastobasis confectella
 Blastobasis controversella Zeller, 1877
 Blastobasis cophodes Meyrick, 1918
 Blastobasis crassifica Meyrick, 1916
 Blastobasis crypsimorpha Meyrick, 1922
 Blastobasis curta Meyrick, 1916
 Blastobasis custodis
 Blastobasis dapis
 Blastobasis deae
 Blastobasis decolor Meyrick, 1907
 Blastobasis decolorella Wollaston, 1858
 Blastobasis deliciolarum
 Blastobasis desertarum (Wollaston, 1858)
 Blastobasis determinata Meyrick, 1921
 Blastobasis dicionis
 Blastobasis divisus (Walsingham, 1894)
 Blastobasis drymosa Adamski & Li, 2010
 Blastobasis dyssema Turner, 1918
 Blastobasis echus
 Blastobasis egens Meyrick, 1918
 Blastobasis elgonae Adamski, 2010
 Blastobasis episema Turner, 1918
 Blastobasis erae
 Blastobasis ergastulella Zeller, 1877
 Blastobasis eridryas Meyrick, 1932
 Blastobasis evanescens Walsingham, 1901
 Blastobasis exclusa (Walsingham, 1908)
 Blastobasis fatigata Meyrick, 1914
 Blastobasis fax
 Blastobasis floridella
 Blastobasis furtivus
 Blastobasis fuscomaculella Ragonot, 1879
 Blastobasis glandulella – "acorn moth"
 Blastobasis glauconotata Adamski, 2010
 Blastobasis gracilis Walsingham, 1897
 Blastobasis graminea
 Blastobasis grenadensis Walsingham, 1897
 Blastobasis helleri Rebel, 1910
 Blastobasis homadelpha
 Blastobasis huemeri Sinev, 1994
 Blastobasis ianella
 Blastobasis inana
 Blastobasis incuriosa
 Blastobasis inderskella Caradja, 1920
 Blastobasis indigesta Meyrick, 1931
 Blastobasis indirecta Meyrick, 1935
 Blastobasis industria Meyrick, 1913
 Blastobasis inouei Moriuti, 1987
 Blastobasis insularis (Wollaston, 1858)
 Blastobasis intrepida Meyrick, 1911
 Blastobasis invigorata (Meyrick, 1932)
 Blastobasis iuanae
 Blastobasis kenya Adamski, 2010
 Blastobasis lacticolella
 Blastobasis laurisilvae Sinev & Karsholt, 2004
 Blastobasis lavernella Walsingham, 1894
 Blastobasis lecaniella Busck, 1913
 Blastobasis legrandi Adamski, 1995
 Blastobasis leucogonia Zeller, 1877
 Blastobasis leucotoxa
 Blastobasis leucozyga Meyrick, 1936
 Blastobasis lex
 Blastobasis litis
 Blastobasis lososi
 Blastobasis luteella Sinev & Karsholt, 2004
 Blastobasis lutiflua Meyrick, 1922
 Blastobasis lygdi
 Blastobasis magna Amsel, 1952
 Blastobasis manto
 Blastobasis marmorosella (Wollaston, 1858)
 Blastobasis maroccanella Amsel, 1952
 Blastobasis millicentae Adamski, 2010
 Blastobasis mnemosynella Millière, 1876
 Blastobasis moffetti
 Blastobasis molinda
 Blastobasis monozona
 Blastobasis mpala Adamski, 2010
 Blastobasis murcyae
 Blastobasis neniae
 Blastobasis neozona Meyrick, 1918
 Blastobasis nephelias
 Blastobasis nephelophaea Meyrick, 1931
 Blastobasis neptes (Walsingham, 1912)
 Blastobasis nigromaculata (Wollaston, 1858)
 Blastobasis nivis
 Blastobasis normalis
 Blastobasis nothrotes
 Blastobasis ochreopalpella (Wollaston, 1858)
 Blastobasis ochrobathra
 Blastobasis ochromorpha
 Blastobasis orithyia
 Blastobasis orladelaneae
 Blastobasis pacalis Meyrick, 1922
 Blastobasis pallescens
 Blastobasis paludis
 Blastobasis pannonica Sumpich & Liska, 2011
 Blastobasis parki Sinev, 1986
 Blastobasis pentasticta
 Blastobasis phaedra
 Blastobasis phaeopasta
 Blastobasis phycidella (Zeller, 1839)
 Blastobasis pica (Walsingham, 1894)
 Blastobasis ponticella Sinev, 2007
 Blastobasis proagorella Zeller, 1877
 Blastobasis pulchella
 Blastobasis quaintancella
 Blastobasis rebeli Sinev & Karsholt, 2004
 Blastobasis repartella
 Blastobasis retectella
 Blastobasis rosmarinella Walsingham, 1901
 Blastobasis rotae
 Blastobasis rotullae
 Blastobasis rubiginosella Rebel, 1896
 Blastobasis salebrosella Rebel, 1940
 Blastobasis sardinica Sumpich, 2012
 Blastobasis sciota Bradley, 1961
 Blastobasis scotia
 Blastobasis semilutea Meyrick, 1916
 Blastobasis serradaguae Sinev & Karsholt, 2004
 Blastobasis sinica Adamski & Li, 2010
 Blastobasis spectabilella Rebel, 1940
 Blastobasis spermologa
 Blastobasis spiniella Park, 2000
 Blastobasis splendens Sinev & Karsholt, 2004
 Blastobasis sprotundalis Park, 1984
 Blastobasis subdivisus Sinev & Karsholt, 2004
 Blastobasis subolivacea Walsingham, 1897
 Blastobasis suppletella Zeller, 1877
 Blastobasis syrmatodes Meyrick, 1922
 Blastobasis tabernatella (Legrand, 1966)
 Blastobasis tanyptera
 Blastobasis tapetae
 Blastobasis tarachodes (Walsingham, 1912)
 Blastobasis tarda
 Blastobasis taricheuta Meyrick, 1909
 Blastobasis taurusella Adamski, 2004
 Blastobasis thyone
 Blastobasis trachelista Meyrick, 1921
 Blastobasis transcripta
 Blastobasis triangularis Walsingham, 1897
 Blastobasis tridigitella
 Blastobasis usurae
 Blastobasis velutina Walsingham, 1908
 Blastobasis vesta
 Blastobasis virgatella Sinev & Karsholt, 2004
 Blastobasis vittata
 Blastobasis walsinghami Sinev & Karsholt, 2004
 Blastobasis wolffi Sinev & Karsholt, 2004
 Blastobasis wollastoni Sinev & Karsholt, 2004
 Blastobasis xiphiae
 Blastobasis yuccaecolella

Footnotes

References
  (2008): Australian Faunal Directory – Blastobasis. Version of 2008-OCT-09. Retrieved 2010-APR-28.
  (2009): Blastobasis. Version 2.1, 2009-DEC-22. Retrieved 2010-APR-28.
  (2004): Butterflies and Moths of the World, Generic Names and their Type-species – Blastobasis. Version of 2004-NOV-05. Retrieved 2010-APR-28.
  (2001): Markku Savela's Lepidoptera and some other life forms – Blastobasis. Version of 2001-NOV-07. Retrieved 2010-APR-28.
  (2008): Coleophoridae. Version of 2008-MAY-01. Retrieved 2010-APR-28.
 , 2013: Review of the Blastobasinae of Costa Rica (Lepidoptera: Gelechioidea: Blastobasidae). Zootaxa 3618 (1): 1-223. Review and full article: 
 , 2002: New species of Blastobasis Zeller from New Caledonia and Fiji (Lepidoptera: Gelechioidea: Coleophoridae: Blastobasinae). Insecta Koreana 19 (2): 137-145.
 , 2010: Three new species of Blastobasinae moths from Beijing, China (Lepidoptera: Gelechioidea: Coleophoridae). Shilap Revista de Lepidopterologica 38 (151): 341-351.
 , 2010: A review of African Blastobasinae (Lepidoptera: Gelechioidea: Coleophoridae), with new taxa reared from native fruits in Kenya. Smithsonian contributions to Zoology 630: 1-68. Full article: .
 , 2004: Contribution of the Lepidoptera fauna of the Madeira Islands. Part 4. Blastobasidae. Beiträge zur Entomologie 54 (2): 387-463.

 
Blastobasidae genera
Taxa named by Philipp Christoph Zeller